The 1920 Tour de France was the 14th edition of Tour de France, one of cycling's Grand Tours. The Tour began in Paris with a flat stage on 27 June, and Stage 8 occurred on 11 July with a flat stage to Aix-en-Provence. The race finished in Paris on 27 July.

Stage 1
27 June 1920 — Paris to Le Havre,

Stage 2
29 June 1920 — Le Havre to Cherbourg-en-Cotentin,

Stage 3
1 July 1920 — Cherbourg-en-Cotentin to Brest,

Stage 4
3 July 1920 — Brest to Les Sables-d'Olonne,

Stage 5
5 July 1920 — Les Sables-d'Olonne to Bayonne,

Stage 6
7 July 1920 — Bayonne to Luchon,

Stage 7
9 July 1920 — Luchon to Perpignan,

Stage 8
11 July 1920 — Perpignan to Aix-en-Provence,

References

1920 Tour de France
Tour de France stages